Albania participated in the Eurovision Song Contest 2011 in Düsseldorf, Germany, with the song "Feel the Passion" performed by Aurela Gaçe. Its selected entry was chosen through the national selection competition Festivali i Këngës organised by Radio Televizioni Shqiptar (RTSH) in December 2010. Prior to the contest, the song was promoted by a music video and live performances both in Belarus, Greece, Turkey and the Netherlands. Albania was drawn to compete in the first semi-final of the Eurovision Song Contest, which took place on 10 May 2011. Performing as number three, the nation was not announced among the top 10 entries of the semi-final and therefore failed to qualify for the grand final, marking Albania's third non-qualification in the contest.

Background 

The nation's highest placing in the contest, to this point, had been the seventh place, which it achieved in 2004 with the song "The Image of You" performed by Anjeza Shahini. During its tenure in the contest, Albania failed to qualify for the final two times, with the  entry being the most recent non-qualifier. The nation's national broadcaster, Radio Televizioni Shqiptar (RTSH), has organised Festivali i Këngës since its inauguration in 1962. Since 2003, the winner of the competition has simultaneously won the right to represent Albania in the Eurovision Song Contest.

Before Eurovision

Festivali i Këngës 

RTSH organised the 49th edition of Festivali i Këngës to determine Albania's representative for the Eurovision Song Contest 2011. The competition consisted of three semi-finals on 23 and 24 December, respectively, and the grand final on 25 December 2010. The three live shows were hosted by Albanian singer Jonida Maliqi, presenter Josif Gjinpali and actress Mirela Naska. There were two different categories in Festivali i Këngës, including for the established and newcomer artists. The two semi-finals each featured 16 competing entries performed by established artists and three competing entries performed by newcomers. The votes of a jury panel selected eleven entries from the established artists in each semi-final to advance to the final, while the votes of an alternate jury panel selected one entry from the newcomer artists in each semi-final to advance to the final. In the final, the eighteen competing entries were voted upon by a jury panel in order to select the winner. Due to technical problems with the orchestra, the basic music was in playback.

Competing entries 

RTSH invited interested artists and composers to submit their entries between 12 September and 20 October 2010. The deadline was later extended to 6 November 2010 in order to give more time for the artists participating in Kënga Magjike to work on their entries. On 15 November 2010, RTSH announced the 38 artists and songs selected for the competition by a special committee consisting of Altin Goci, Fatmir Hysi, Hajg Zaharian, Kozeta Mamaqi, Mefarete Laze, Thoma Gaqi and Zef Çoba.

Key:
 Withdrawn

Shows

Semi-finals 

The semi-finals of Festivali i Këngës took place on 23 December and 24 December 2010 on the respective dates. 17 contestants participated in each semi-final, with the highlighted ones progressing to the grand final.

Final 

The grand final of Festivali i Këngës took place on 25 December 2010 and was broadcast live at 20:30 (CET). Determined by the combination of the votes from a seven-member jury, Aurela Gaçe with "Kënga ime" emerged as the winner and was thus announced as Albania's representative for the Eurovision Song Contest 2011.

Promotion 

A music video for "Feel the Passion" premiered via the Eurovision Song Contest's official YouTube channel on 16 March 2011. For promotional purposes, Gaçe embarked on a small tour with live performances at various events related to the contest, including in Belarus, Greece, Turkey and the Netherlands.

At Eurovision 

The Eurovision Song Contest 2011 took place at Esprit Arena in Düsseldorf, Germany, and consisted of two semi-finals held on 10 and 12 May, respectively, and the grand final on 14 May 2011. On 17 January 2011, a special allocation draw was held that placed each country into one of the two semi-finals, as well as which half of the show they would perform in. Albania was placed into the first semi-final, to be held on 10 May, and was scheduled to perform in the first half of the show. Once all the competing songs for the 2011 contest had been released, the running order for the semi-finals was decided by the producers of the contest rather than through another draw, for preventing similar songs being placed next to each other; Albania was set to perform in position 3, following  and preceding . At the end of the first semi-final, the country was not announced among the top 10 entries in the semi-final and therefore failed to qualify for the grand final, marking Albania's third non-qualification in the Eurovision Song Contest.

Voting 

The tables below visualise a breakdown of points awarded to Albania in the first semi-final of the Eurovision Song Contest 2011, as well as by the country for both the second semi-final and grand final.

Points awarded to Albania

Points awarded by Albania

Notes

References 

2011
Countries in the Eurovision Song Contest 2011
2010
Eurovision
Eurovision